Dr. J. Daniel Chellappa is a Technical coordinator with Department for Atomic Energy (India) and Indira Gandhi Centre for Atomic Research, Chennai. [http://www.igcar.ernet.in/press_releases/press38.htm

He is also the author of various Research Publication books.

He was honoured with the coveted ‘High-Achiever (Chanakya) Special Award for the Outstanding Public Communication Professional’ and various other Distinguished Awards.

References

Indian nuclear physicists
Living people
Year of birth missing (living people)